Elba Township is the name of some places in the U.S. state of Michigan:

 Elba Township, Gratiot County, Michigan
 Elba Township, Lapeer County, Michigan

See also 
 Elba Township (disambiguation)

Michigan township disambiguation pages